Paul J. Hergenrother is an American chemist and the Kenneth L. Rinehart Jr. Endowed Chair in Natural Products chemistry at the University of Illinois Urbana-Champaign. His research focuses on the development of organic small molecules with novel biological properties such as enzyme inhibitors and activators, chemotherapeutics, and antibacterial agents. In 2008 Hergenrother was awarded the Eli Lilly Award in Biological Chemistry.

Education 
Hergenrother attended college at University of Notre Dame. In 1999, Hergenrother earned his PhD in Chemistry from the University of Texas where he worked in the lab of Professor Stephen F. Martin.

Career and research 
From 1999 to 2001, Hergenrother completed an American Cancer Society postdoctoral fellowship at Harvard University in the lab of Professor Stuart Schreiber. In 2001, Hergenrother became a faculty member in the Department of Chemistry at the University of Illinois Urbana-Champaign.

Notable papers 
Web of Science lists 215 publications authored by Hergenrother in peer-reviewed scientific journals that have been cited over 8000 times. His three most cited research articles have been cited >200 times each.

Awards and honors 

 2016 - Ehrlich Award for Excellence in Medicinal Chemistry
 2008 - Eli Lilly Award in Biological Chemistry
 2006 - American Cancer Society Research Scholar
 2006 - Camille Dreyfus Teacher-Scholar Award
 2006 - ACS David Robertson Award for Excellence in Medicinal Chemistry
 2006 - GlaxoSmithKline Chemistry Scholar Award
 2005 - Sloan Research Fellow
 2003 - Beckman Young Investigator Award
 2003 - Research Corporation Research Innovation Award
 2002 - National Science Foundation Career Award

References 

University of Illinois Urbana-Champaign faculty
University of Texas alumni
Year of birth missing (living people)
Living people
American chemists